Clyde John Zoia (May 16, 1896 – April 3, 1955) was an American football guard who played four seasons with the Chicago Cardinals of the National Football League. He played college football at the University of Notre Dame and attended Woodstock High School in Woodstock, Illinois

References

External links
Just Sports Stats
Fanbase profile

1896 births
1955 deaths
People from Preston, Minnesota
Players of American football from Minnesota
American football offensive guards
Notre Dame Fighting Irish football players
Chicago Cardinals players